Wesley Irwin Haskett (April 22, 1903 – March 23, 1994) was a politician in Ontario, Canada. He was a Progressive Conservative member of the Legislative Assembly of Ontario from 1959 to 1971 who represented the riding of Ottawa South. He was a cabinet minister in the government of Leslie Frost.

Background
He was born in Montreal, the son of Samuel Wesley Haskett, and was educated at Lisgar Collegiate Institute in Ottawa. He became an attorney specializing in patent law. In 1936, he married Vera Moorhead. Haskett was a freemason. Vera died in 1970 and Haskett remarried Mary Costache.

Haskett was active in the Ottawa community serving as president of the Ottawa Board of Trade and the Ontario Chamber of Commerce. He was one of the founders of the annual Tulip Festival in Ottawa which he regularly attended. His wife Mary said, "We always went to look at the tulips." He died in 1994.

Politics
In the 1959 provincial election, he ran as the Progressive Conservative candidate in the riding of Ottawa South. He defeated Liberal candidate Archibald Laidlaw by 1,936 votes. He was re-elected in 1963 and 1967. He retired from office in 1971.
 
On November 8, 1961, he was appointed to cabinet as Minister of Reform Institutions. On August 14, 1963 he was reassigned as Minister of Transport. He continued as Minister until 1971 when Bill Davis decided to drop him from his cabinet.

Cabinet positions

References

External links 
 

1903 births
1994 deaths
Politicians from Ottawa
Progressive Conservative Party of Ontario MPPs
Lisgar Collegiate Institute alumni